The 2. Bundesliga Süd was the second-highest level of the West German football league system in the south of West Germany from its introduction in 1974 until the formation of the single-division 2. Bundesliga in 1981. It covered the southern states of Saarland, Rhineland-Palatinate, Baden-Württemberg, Hesse and Bavaria.

Overview 
The league was established in 1974 to reduce the number of second divisions in Germany from five to two and thereby allow direct promotion to the league winners. Along with the foundation of the 2. Bundesliga Süd, formed from clubs of the two former  of Süd and Südwest, went the foundation of the 2. Bundesliga Nord, which was created from clubs of the other three , Nord, Berlin and West.

The league was created from thirteen southern and seven southwestern clubs, reflecting the difference in size of the two regions, south being much the larger.

The winner of the 2. Bundesliga Süd was directly promoted to the Bundesliga, the runners-up played a home-and-away series versus the northern runners-up for the third promotion spot.

The league operated with 20 teams in six seasons of its existence, only in 1980 were there 21 teams in the league. The bottom three, some years four teams were relegated to the Amateurligas, after 1978 to the new .

Until 1978, below the 2. Bundesliga Süd ranked the following Amateurligas:

 Saarland
 Rheinland
 Südwest
 Württemberg
 Schwarzwald-Bodensee
 Nordbaden
 Südbaden
 Hessen
 Bayern

The winners of the larger leagues of Bayern and Hessen were directly promoted, while the other seven leagues had to play-off for two more promotion spots. After 1978, these seven leagues merged down to two new leagues and the champions of those four remaining leagues, now called , were all directly promoted to the 2. Bundesliga Süd.

 Südwest
 Baden-Württemberg
 Hessen
 Bayern

In 1981, the two 2. Bundesligas merged into one, country-wide division. Nine clubs from the south and eight from the north plus the three relegated teams from the Bundesliga were admitted into the new league, the 2. Bundesliga.

The Stuttgarter Kickers, SV Waldhof Mannheim, SpVgg Fürth, SpVgg Bayreuth and FC Homburg all played every one of the seven seasons of the league.

Qualifying to the 2. Bundesliga Süd 
From the  Südwest, seven clubs qualified for the new 2. Bundesliga Süd; from the  Süd it was 13 clubs.

The qualifying modus saw the last five seasons counted, whereby the last placed team in each season received one point, the second-last two points and so on. For a Bundesliga season within this five-year period, a club received 25 points; for an Amateurliga season, none.

For the seasons 1969–70 and 70–71, the received points counted single, for the 71–72 and 72–73 season double and for the 73–74 season three times.

The bottom three clubs in each league, nominally the relegated teams in every other season, were barred from entry to the 2. Bundesliga, regardless of where they stood in the points ranking.

Südwest points table 

 
 Bold teams are promoted to the 2. Bundesliga.
 1 SV Alsenborn was denied the 2. Bundesliga licence.

Regionalliga Süd points table 

 
 Bold teams are promoted to the 2. Bundesliga.
 1 Barred from gaining access to the 2. Bundesliga due to having finished on a relegation spot.

Disbanding of the 2. Bundesliga Süd 
The league was dissolved in 1981. According to their performance of the last couple of seasons, nine clubs of the league went to the new 2. Bundesliga while the champion was promoted to Bundesliga. The ten remaining clubs were relegated to the Amateurligas.

The teams admitted to the 2. Bundesliga were:

 Kickers Offenbach, runners-up
 Stuttgarter Kickers, 3rd
 KSV Hessen Kassel, 4th
 SV Waldhof Mannheim, 6th
 SC Freiburg, 7th
 SpVgg Bayreuth, 9th
 Freiburger FC, 10th
 VfR Wormatia Worms, 12th
 SpVgg Fürth, 14th

Of the nine clubs, only one came from the southwest region, VfR Wormatia Worms; all others were southern clubs.

Relegated teams to the Oberliga:

 Bayern: ESV Ingolstadt, FC Augsburg
 Hessen: VfR Bürstadt, FSV Frankfurt
 Baden-Württemberg: SSV Ulm 1846, VfB Eppingen
 Südwest: Eintracht Trier, FC Homburg, 1. FC Saarbrücken, Borussia Neunkirchen

The reduction in numbers of second division teams hit especially the Saarland hard, having their three most well known clubs, all members of the Bundesliga at some stage, relegated. While the FC Homburg and the 1. FC Saarbrücken soon bounced back, Borussia Neunkirchen never returned to second division football but did remain a force in the Oberliga Südwest.

Winners and runners-up
The winners and runners-up of the league were:

 Promoted teams in bold.

Play-offs for Bundesliga promotion 
The third promotion spot to the Bundesliga was decided through a play-off round of the runners-up of the two 2. Bundesligas. The results of this round are as follows:

 Bold denotes promotion-winner.

Placings in the 2. Bundesliga Süd 1974–1981 
The league placings from 1974 to 1981:

Source:

Key

Notes
FSV Mainz 05 withdrew from the league in 1976.

Top scorers

References

Sources
 Deutschlands Fußball in Zahlen,  An annual publication with tables and results from the Bundesliga to Verbandsliga/Landesliga, publisher: DSFS
 Kicker Almanach,  The yearbook on German football from Bundesliga to Oberliga, since 1937, published by the Kicker Sports Magazine
 Süddeutschlands Fussballgeschichte in Tabellenform 1897-1988  History of Southern German football in tables, publisher & author: Ludolf Hyll
 Die Deutsche Liga-Chronik 1945-2005  History of German football from 1945 to 2005 in tables, publisher: DSFS, published: 2006

External links 
 Das deutsche Fußball-Archiv
 The 2. Bundesliga Süd at Weltfussball.de (with round-by-round results and tables)

1981 disestablishments in Germany
Defunct association football leagues in Germany
2. Bundesliga
Football competitions in Saarland
Football competitions in Rhineland-Palatinate
Football competitions in Baden-Württemberg
Defunct football leagues in Bavaria
Football competitions in Hesse
1974 establishments in West Germany
Sports leagues established in 1974
Sports leagues disestablished in 1981
Ger